Charles August; 17 September 1685, Weilburg – 9 November 1753) was from 1719 to 1753 Prince of Nassau-Weilburg.

Charles August was the second son of John Ernst of Nassau-Weilburg and Maria Polyxena of Leiningen-Dagsburg-Hartenburg.  In his youth, he worked as a diplomat for Saxony; for a while he was the Saxon ambassador in Paris. He succeeded his father as Prince in Weilburg on 27 February 1719.

In 1733 and 1734, he commanded the imperial troops on the Rhine as an imperial cavalry general.

In 1737 he assumed the title of Prince, which family had been awarded in 1688. In 1688 the family had not, however, obtained a seat on the princely bench in the Imperial Diet, and in protest, they had not used their title. In 1737, the seat in the diet was finally awarded and Charles August started using his princely title.

Charles August died in 1753 and was buried in the chapel of Weilburg. He was succeeded by his son Charles Christian after.

Descendants 
Charles August married on 17 August 1723 in Wiesbaden, Princess Auguste Friederike of Nassau-Idstein (1699–1750), daughter of George August, Count of Nassau-Idstein. They had the following children:

 Henrietta Maria Dorothea (1724)
 Henrietta Augusta Frederica (1726–1757)
 Christiana Louise (1727)
 Polyxena Louise Wilhelmina (1728–1732)
 Christiana Louise Charlotte (1730–1732)
 Louise Polyxena (born: 27 January 1733; died: 27 September 1764)
 married Prince Simon August of Lippe-Detmold
 Charles Christian (1735–1788)
 married firstly in 1760 Princess Carolina of Orange-Nassau daughter of William IV, Prince of Orange (1743–1787)
 married secondly in 1788 Barbara Giessen of Kirchheim

Ancestors

References 
 
 Nassau, in: Heinrich August Pierer, Julius Löbe (eds.): Universal-Lexikon der Gegenwart und Vergangenheit, 4th edition, vol. 9, Altenburg 1860, pp 692–700, online at zeno.org

External links  
 Familienliste auf www.royaltyguide.nl
  www.thepeerage.com

Princes of Nassau
Generals of the Holy Roman Empire
House of Nassau
House of Nassau-Weilburg
1685 births
1753 deaths
18th-century German military personnel
Burials in the Royal Crypt of Weilburg Schlosskirche